Mutukula is a town in the Central Region of Uganda, the third-largest economy in the East African Community. It sits adjacent to Mutukula, Tanzania, directly across the international border between Uganda and Tanzania.

Location
Mutukula is located in extreme southern Kyotera District at the international border between Uganda and Tanzania. The coordinates of the town are 1°00'00.0"S, 31°25'00.0"E Latitude:-1.0000; Longitude:31.4167).

Overview
The town of Mutukula is a border town between Uganda and Tanzania. In February 2016, the border post between both countries merged operations on both sides. Vehicles and passengers clear customs and immigration once, in the country they are entering, with officials from both countries present.

In 2017, the border crossing between Mutukula, Uganda and Mutukula, Tanzania was converted into a one-stop-border-post (OSBP), open 24 hours every day of the year. Vehicles, passengers, luggage, merchandise and pedestrians are cleared once by customs and immigration staff from both countries, at a station in the country of entry. This cuts the time it takes to cross by anywhere from 30 percent to 50 percent. Other stakeholders report reduction in crossing times by as much as 90 percent.

Population
As of July 2009, the population of Mutukula was estimated at 15,000 people.

Points of interest

See also
 Mutukula, Tanzania
 List of cities and towns in Uganda

References

External links
Mutukula: Where residents live in two countries

Populated places in Central Region, Uganda
Cities in the Great Rift Valley
Tanzania–Uganda border crossings
Kyotera District